Jenne can refer to:

Djenné, a city of Mali
Jenne, Lazio, a city and comune in the Metropolitan City of Rome, Italy

People with the given name
Jenne Langhout (1918–2010), Dutch field hockey player
Jenne Lennon, American singer

People with the surname
Crystal Snow Jenne (1884–1968), first woman to run for the Alaska Territorial House of Representatives
Eldon Jenne (1899–1993), American track and field athlete
Peter Jenne (?–1945), German Knight's Cross of the Iron Cross recipient
Ken Jenne (born 1947), American politician in Florida
Evan Jenne (born 1977), American politician in Florida, son of Ken Jenne
Addie Jenne, American politician in New York